So... Happy Together ( Happy Together and Que sera sera) is a 2004 Filipino romantic comedy film about friendship, written by Ricardo Lee, directed by Joel Lamangan, and produced by Regal Films. Led by Kris Aquino and Eric Quizon in their second film together, the film's supporting stars include Tonton Gutierrez, Gloria Diaz, Cogie Domingo, Nova Villa, and Jay-R.

Plot
After meeting during the 1980s at the first gay pride parade in Malate, the talkative Lianne (Kris Aquino) and the colorfully gay Osmond (Eric Quizon) become fast friends.  Over the next 30 years, the two do everything together... dining, shopping, discussing life, and even looking for the perfect man. The two became so inseparable, that even their mothers had become best friends as well. The Lianne and Osmond friendship lasts for decades, even beyond Lianne's becoming a mother to two teenage daughters and until Osmond's death.

Cast

Main cast

 Kris Aquino as Lianne Vergara
 Eric Quizon as Osmond

Supporting cast

 Tonton Gutierrez as Erwin 
 Gloria Diaz as Daisy
 Cogie Domingo as Oliver
 Nova Villa as Serapica
 Jay-R as Brent
 Mark Herras as Zhander
 Jennylyn Mercado as Rowena
 Yasmien Kurdi as Serafica
 Rainier Castillo as Miles

Also starring

 Linda Gordon as Dianne
 Carlo Maceda as Gordon
 Paolo Paraiso as Randy
 Clint Pijuan
 Richard Quan as AJ
 Douglas Robinson as Hugh Dakma
 Jon Romano as Jay
 Jojo Vinzon as Violet

Recognition
 2004, Eric Quizon won Golden Screen Award at Metro Manila Film Festival Philippines for "Best Actor" for his role of Osmond.

Reception
Manila Bulletin praised the film, writing that "Happy Together is a funfilled comedy drama" and "the most unexpected and surprising movie of the season."

References

External links 
 
  archived September 11, 2005

2004 films
Philippine LGBT-related films
2000s Tagalog-language films
LGBT-related romantic comedy films
2004 LGBT-related films
Regal Entertainment films
2004 romantic comedy films
Philippine romantic comedy films
Films directed by Joel Lamangan